Marie-Cécile Helene Collet was a French lawyer and politician in the Seychelles. In 1948 she became the first female member of the islands' Legislative Council.

Biography
A lawyer, Collet met her husband Charles Évariste Collet while he was studying medicine in France. She encouraged him to become a barrister. The couple moved to Seychelles in 1946, where both worked as barristers. In 1947 Charles was appointed Attorney General, and the following year became a member of the Legislative Council. In the same year, Marie was also appointed to the Legislative Council as a replacement for Nageon de Lestang, becoming its first female member. She served on the Council until 1950.

References

Date of birth unknown
French women lawyers
Seychellois lawyers
French emigrants to the Seychelles
Members of the National Assembly (Seychelles)
Date of death unknown
20th-century French lawyers